Živa Vadnov (born c. 1982) is a Slovenian beauty queen who was crowned as Miss Slovenia 2004 and represented her country at the Miss World 2004 pageant in Sanya, China. She married her longtime partner Klemen on June 25, 2011.

References 

1980s births
Living people
Miss World 2004 delegates
Slovenian female models
Slovenian beauty pageant winners
Place of birth missing (living people)